František Kříž (18 May 1884 – 30 July 1966) was a fencer who competed for Bohemia in 1912 and Czechoslovakia in 1928.

References

1884 births
1966 deaths
Czech male fencers
Olympic fencers of Bohemia
Olympic fencers of Czechoslovakia
Fencers at the 1912 Summer Olympics
Fencers at the 1928 Summer Olympics
Sportspeople from Prague
Place of death missing